Vanessa Block is an American film director, screenwriter and producer. She is known for the 2021 film Pig starring Nicolas Cage, Alex Wolff, and Adam Arkin; as well as The Testimony, which was shortlisted with ten other documentaries from 74 entries submitted to the 88th Academy Awards in Documentary Short Subject category. Block co-wrote Pig with director Michael Sarnoski, as well as produced through her production company, BlockBox Entertainment.

She completed her undergraduate studies at Yale University, where she majored in chemistry, was on the track and field team, and founded JEWL (The Jewish Educated Women's League). Block also attended the University of Southern California (USC), where she earned a master's degree in global medicine from the Keck School of Medicine.

References

External links
 

Living people
American women film directors
American women screenwriters
American women film producers
American Jews
Yale College alumni
University of Southern California alumni
Year of birth missing (living people)
21st-century American women